Thorne is a civil parish in the metropolitan borough of Doncaster, South Yorkshire, England.  The parish contains 23 listed buildings that are recorded in the National Heritage List for England.  Of these, one is listed at Grade I, the highest of the three grades, and the others are at Grade II, the lowest grade. The parish contains the town of Thorne, the village of Moorends, and the surrounding countryside.  Most of the listed buildings are houses and associated structures, and farmhouses.  The other listed buildings include a church, a coffin in the churchyard, a public house, a former windmill, a river wharf, two war memorials, and a former charity school.


Key

Buildings

References

Citations

Sources

 

Lists of listed buildings in South Yorkshire
Buildings and structures in the Metropolitan Borough of Doncaster
Listed